In Laos, society is characterized by semi-independent rural villages engaged in subsistence agricultural production. Ethnic, geographic, and ecological differences create variations in the pattern of village life from one part of the country to another, but the common threads of village self-reliance, limited regional trade and communication, and identification with one's village and ethnic group persist regardless of the setting. Rural trade networks, however, have been a part of life since the 1950s. Except near the larger towns and in the rich agricultural plains of Vientiane and Savannakhét, villages are spaced at least several kilometers apart and the intervening land variously developed as rice paddy and swidden fields or maintained as buffer forest for gathering wild plants and animals, fuelwood, and occasional timber harvest.

Ethnicity differentiates the villages but is usually not a source of conflict or antagonism. Nearly all villages are ethnically homogeneous, although a few include two or more distinct groups. Ethnic mixing often has resulted from different groups migrating to a new settlement site at about the same time, or a larger village at a crossroads or river transit point developing into a minor trading center. Ethnic identity is never absolutely immutable. Some minority Laotian individuals have adopted lowland Lao behavior and dress patterns, or intermarried with lowland Lao, and have effectively acculturated to lowland society. In some units, military service has also brought together Laotians of different ethnic groups, both before and after 1975.

Only since 1975 has there been any sense of national unity among most rural villagers. Precolonial governments depended more on a system of control at the district level with the chao muang (district chief) maintaining his own allegiance and tribute to the state. Administrative practices under the French and during the post-World War II period was confined primarily to provincial and a few district centers. The government was able to extract taxes with some facility but had little impact on the daily lives or thoughts of most villagers. However, since 1975, the government has expended considerable energy and resources on national unification, so that even isolated villages recognize the role of local government and consider themselves at some level to be part of a Laotian state.

References

Society of Laos